Monty Don's Italian Gardens is a television series of 4 programmes in which British gardener and broadcaster Monty Don visits several of Italy's most celebrated gardens.

Steve Wilson composed the title and theme music on the series. A book based on the series, Great Gardens of Italy, was also published.

Gardens

See also
 Around the World in 80 Gardens
 Monty Don's French Gardens
 Monty Don's Paradise Gardens

References

External links
 Review in The Daily Telegraph, 11 March 2011
 Review in The Guardian, 7 May 2011
 Review in The Express, 22 Apr 2011
 
 

BBC television documentaries
Gardening television
2000s British travel television series